The Gute is a landrace-based breed of domestic sheep native to the Swedish island of Gotland. The Gute is the most primitive breed native to Sweden, and is one of the Northern European short-tailed sheep. The modern Gotland breed is its direct descendant. Unlike the Gotland, the Gute is horned in both rams and ewes, and has a fleece that appears in a wider variety of colors and patterns, which may be shed in the summer.  This breed is raised primarily for genetic conservation.

Color
The most common color of Gute are grey. The ones that are dark grey have black heads and legs. Light grey Gute have white and tan hair on their legs and head. Grey and Black sheep typically have light hair around the eyes and face. The white sheep are seldom all white. White sheep usually have tan patches on the neck and other 
parts of the body. Most all non-white sheep have markings that are white. The markings can vary greatly.

Size

Weight
ram: 70-100 kg 
ewe: 45-60 kg

Height 
ram: 64-84 cm 
ewe: 65-71 cm

Horn length 
ram: 39-90 cm 
ewe: 21-43 cm

Horn circumference at base
ram: 20-29 cm 
ewe: 12-14 cm

Tail length 
rams: 13-17 cm
ewe: 13-17 cm

References

External links

 The Gute Sheep Society of Sweden

Sheep breeds originating in Sweden
Sheep breeds